Charles Collier Perkins (8 August 1906 – 7 November 1961) was an Australian politician who was a Country Party member of the Legislative Assembly of Western Australia from 1942 until his death. He served as a minister in the government of Sir David Brand.

Perkins was born in Melbourne to Gwendoline (née Collier) and Charles Henry Perkins. Educated at Geelong Grammar School, he arrived in Western Australia in 1929 and purchased a farm at Belka, which he owned for the rest of his life. Perkins became prominent in agricultural circles, serving on the executive of the Primary Producers' Association and as a director of Westralian Farmers Ltd, a co-operative. He entered parliament at the 1942 York by-election, which had been caused by the resignation of Charles Latham (a former Country Party leader).

After the 1947 state election, Perkins was appointed chairman of the committees in the Legislative Assembly, a position which held until the McLarty government's defeat at the 1953 election. At the 1950 election, he had transferred to the new seat of Roe. After the 1959 election, Perkins was included in the new ministry formed by David Brand, as Minister for Police, Minister for Transport, Minister for Labour, and Minister for Native Welfare. His four portfolios required large amounts of travel, including to interstate conferences and remote Aboriginal communities.

Perkins died of a heart attack in November 1961, at his home in Wembley, and was given a state funeral at St George's Cathedral. He had married Kathleen Jennings Laffar in 1938, with whom he had four children.

References

|-

|-

|-

|-

|-

|-

1906 births
1961 deaths
Australian farmers
Chairmen of Committees of the Western Australian Legislative Assembly
Members of the Western Australian Legislative Assembly
National Party of Australia members of the Parliament of Western Australia
People educated at Geelong Grammar School
Politicians from Melbourne
20th-century Australian politicians
Wesfarmers people
People from Moonee Ponds, Victoria